Givi Shaduri (Givi Shaduri) is a fourth novel by Georgian novelist Mikheil Javakhishvili. It was first published in  1928. During his life, it was published several times. It is reputed to one of the best adventure novel in Georgia. 
Mikheil Javakhishvili wrote the novel Givi Shaduri in 1928. The novel follows the adventure genre. It is made up of five independent stories, which have one common character - the story teller, the title named Givi Shaduri.

Plot
The narrator of the novel - Givi Shaduri is talking to the reader from the Feast. Shaduri is the elderly and people skilled in life. Each story of his hard life have used many adventures episode.

References

1928 novels
20th-century Georgian novels
Literature of Georgia (country)
Novels by Mikheil Javakhishvili
Adventure novels
Epistolary novels